Ménélik (Albert Tjamag; born 10 September 1970 in Yaoundé, Cameroon), is a Cameroonian rapper.

Biography
He went to France at the age of nine. Then he met MC Solaar and started to write songs for artists such as No Sé, DJ Jimmy Jay and RPM. In 1995, he released his first album entitled Phenomenelik and performed at Solaar's shows. He toured across Europe and gained a Victoire de la Musique in 1996 in the category 'Male revelation of the year'. In 1997, he released his second album Je me souviens which provided the number five hit "Bye-Bye".

Discography

Albums
 1995 : Phénoménélik – #33
 1997 : Je me souviens – #46
 2000 : OQP
 2001 : E-Pop
 2008 : Mnlk Project 2.0

Singles
 1995 : "Quelle aventure !" (with No Sé) – #8
 1995 : "Tout baigne" (with La Tribu) – #16
 1997 : "Je me souviens" – #30
 1998 : "Bye-Bye" – #5
 1999 : "Touché" – #35
 2000 : "Je t'aime comme t'es" – #59

References

1970 births
French male singers
French rappers
Living people
People from Yaoundé
Cameroonian emigrants to France